Henry Jellett  (1872–1948) was an eminent Irish Gynaecologist, and  author.

Educated at the University of Dublin, he was later Professor of Midwifery there. During World War I he was Commandant of the Munro Ambulance Corps in Northern Flanders and was Mentioned in Despatches, also winning the Chevalier de l’Ordre de la Couronne de Belgique and the Croix de Guerre, Française (with two stars). When peace returned he was consultant  at the Rotunda Hospital, Dublin from 1910 to 1919. Later he was consultant obstetrician to the New Zealand Department of Health. He died on  8 June 1948.

His father, also called Henry Jellett,  was Dean of St Patrick's Cathedral, Dublin from 1889 until his death in 1901.

References

External links
 

1872 births
Medical doctors from Dublin (city)
Alumni of Trinity College Dublin
Academics of Trinity College Dublin
Irish obstetricians
Irish gynaecologists
1948 deaths

Knights of the Order of the Crown (Belgium)
Recipients of the Croix de Guerre 1914–1918 (France)
19th-century Irish medical doctors
20th-century Irish medical doctors